Alessandro D'Antoni (born 3 August 1988) is an Italian footballer, who plays for Serie D club AC Vigasio.

Career

Juventus and loans
D'Antoni started his career working his way through the Juventus F.C. youth ranks , before he made his way to the "Primavera" youth squad in 2006. He never managed a senior team debut with Juventus during 2006–07 Serie B nor 2007–08 Serie A, but after graduating the youth team on 1 July 2008, he was loaned to fourth division club Giulianova.

He was sold to the third division club Figline in co-ownership deal, along with teammates, Salvatore D'Elia, Marco Duravia, and Nicola Cosentini in July 2009. D'Antoni made 26 league appearances for the Lega Pro club in his first season, although the striker only managed 2 league goals. He returned to Juventus in June 2010.

On 8 July 2010 he joined another third division side F.C. Esperia Viareggio, in another co-ownership deal, along with teammates Cosentini, Giorgio Merlano, Tommaso Silvestri (loan), Carlo Pinsoglio (loan), and Luca Castiglia (loan). He played 14 times in the league (nil in relegation playoffs) and played 5 times in the Lega Pro cup.

In June 2011 Juventus gave up the remain 50% registration rights to Viareggio along with Cosentini and Merlano.

Serie C clubs
Despite Viareggio got the full registration rights of D'Antoni, he was transferred to Sammarinese club San Marino Calcio which was playing in Italian Lega Pro Seconda Divisione. He found his goalscoring shoes again with 12 league goals. In July 2012 he left for another fourth division club Borgo-a-Buggiano.

References

External links
 Football.it Profile 
 

Italian footballers
Juventus F.C. players
Giulianova Calcio players
F.C. Esperia Viareggio players
A.S.D. Victor San Marino players
Santarcangelo Calcio players
Mantova 1911 players
S.S. Maceratese 1922 players
A.C. Cuneo 1905 players
S.S.D. Pro Sesto players
A.C. Bra players
Serie C players
Serie D players
Association football forwards
Footballers from Turin
1988 births
Living people